Hans Schwarz (born 4 September 1924) is a Swiss hurdler. He competed in the men's 400 metres hurdles at the 1952 Summer Olympics.

References

External links
 

1924 births
Possibly living people
Athletes (track and field) at the 1952 Summer Olympics
Swiss male hurdlers
Olympic athletes of Switzerland
Place of birth missing (living people)